Virupax Ganesh “VG” Kulkarni (1937–2014), was a Hong Kong-based journalist and Regional Editor of the Far Eastern Economic Review.

Early years
Kulkarni was born in India in 1937 to a noted Brahmin family and served in the Indian Army, rising to major before being sent to serve in Hong Kong at the Indian consulate there.  Kulkarni pursued Chinese studies in Hong Kong, meeting fellow student American Suzanne Pepper there in the 1960s.  After marrying, he left Hong Kong with Pepper for New York where he was employed by United Press International after graduating in Journalism at Columbia University's School of Journalism.  The Kulkarnis returned to Hong Kong in 1973.

Career in Hong Kong
Kulkarni began his Hong Kong career at the Hong Kong Standard newspaper.  He later joined the Manila-based Press Foundation of Asia.  He then began a long career at the Far Eastern Economic Review where, having begun as Singapore correspondent in the 1980s, he rose to regional editor. He wrote extensively on China and the region and, apart from the Review, his reports appeared in Asia Asset Management, Depthnews, India’s Outlook journal, and the Christian Science Monitor.

Kulkarni was a key figure in the Hong Kong Security Studies Group of the Foreign Correspondents' Club, formed from local scholars and diplomats.

References

Hong Kong journalists
1937 births
2014 deaths